The following article lists the oldest known rugby union competitions.

References

Rugby union competitions
Competitions, Oldest